In mathematics, a field is a set on which addition, subtraction, multiplication, and division are defined and behave as the corresponding operations on rational and real numbers do. A field is thus a fundamental algebraic structure which is widely used in algebra, number theory, and many other areas of mathematics.

The best known fields are the field of rational numbers, the field of real numbers and the field of complex numbers. Many other fields, such as fields of rational functions, algebraic function fields, algebraic number fields, and p-adic fields are commonly used and studied in mathematics, particularly in number theory and algebraic geometry. Most cryptographic protocols rely on finite fields, i.e., fields with finitely many elements.

The relation of two fields is expressed by the notion of a field extension. Galois theory, initiated by Évariste Galois in the 1830s, is devoted to understanding the symmetries of field extensions. Among other results, this theory shows that angle trisection and squaring the circle cannot be done with a compass and straightedge. Moreover, it shows that quintic equations are, in general, algebraically unsolvable.

Fields serve as foundational notions in several mathematical domains. This includes different branches of mathematical analysis, which are based on fields with additional structure. Basic theorems in analysis hinge on the structural properties of the field of real numbers. Most importantly for algebraic purposes, any field may be used as the scalars for a vector space, which is the standard general context for linear algebra. Number fields, the siblings of the field of rational numbers, are studied in depth in number theory. Function fields can help describe properties of geometric objects.

Definition 
This allows one to also consider the so-called inverse operations of subtraction, and division, by defining:
,
.

Classic definition

Formally, a field is a set  together with two binary operations on  called addition and multiplication.
 Distributivity of multiplication over addition: .

This may be summarized by saying: a field has two operations, called addition and multiplication; it is an abelian group under addition with 0 as the additive identity; the nonzero elements are an abelian group under multiplication with 1 as the multiplicative identity; and multiplication distributes over addition.

Even more summarized: a field is a commutative ring where  and all nonzero elements are invertible under multiplication.

Alternative definition
Fields can also be defined in different, but equivalent ways. One can alternatively define a field by four binary operations (addition, subtraction, multiplication, and division) and their required properties. Division by zero is, by definition, excluded. In order to avoid existential quantifiers, fields can be defined by two binary operations (addition and multiplication), two unary operations (yielding the additive and multiplicative inverses respectively), and two nullary operations (the constants  and ). These operations are then subject to the conditions above. Avoiding existential quantifiers is important in constructive mathematics and computing.

Examples

Rational numbers

Rational numbers have been widely used a long time before the elaboration of the concept of field.
They are numbers that can be written as fractions

 

The abstractly required field axioms reduce to standard properties of rational numbers. For example, the law of distributivity can be proven as follows:

Real and complex numbers

The real numbers , with the usual operations of addition and multiplication, also form a field. The complex numbers  consist of expressions
 with  real,
where  is the imaginary unit, i.e., a (non-real) number satisfying .
For example, the distributive law enforces

It is immediate that this is again an expression of the above type, and so the complex numbers form a field. Complex numbers can be geometrically represented as points in the plane, with Cartesian coordinates given by the real numbers of their describing expression, or as the arrows from the origin to these points, specified by their length and an angle enclosed with some distinct direction. Addition then corresponds to combining the arrows to the intuitive parallelogram (adding the Cartesian coordinates), and the multiplication is – less intuitively – combining rotating and scaling of the arrows (adding the angles and multiplying the lengths). The fields of real and complex numbers are used throughout mathematics, physics, engineering, statistics, and many other scientific disciplines.

Constructible numbers

In antiquity, several geometric problems concerned the (in)feasibility of constructing certain numbers with compass and straightedge. For example, it was unknown to the Greeks that it is, in general, impossible to trisect a given angle in this way. These problems can be settled using the field of constructible numbers. Real constructible numbers are, by definition, lengths of line segments that can be constructed from the points 0 and 1 in finitely many steps using only compass and straightedge. These numbers, endowed with the field operations of real numbers, restricted to the constructible numbers, form a field, which properly includes the field  of rational numbers. The illustration shows the construction of square roots of constructible numbers, not necessarily contained within .

Not all real numbers are constructible. It can be shown that  is not a constructible number, which implies that it is impossible to construct with compass and straightedge the length of the side of a cube with volume 2, another problem posed by the ancient Greeks.

A field with four elements

In addition to familiar number systems such as the rationals, there are other, less immediate examples of fields. The field axioms can be verified by using some more field theory, or by direct computation. For example,

 , which equals , as required by the distributivity.

In other words, the structure of the binary field is the basic structure that allows computing with bits.

Elementary notions

Consequences of the definition
In particular, one may deduce the additive inverse of every element as soon as one knows .

If  then  or  must be 0, since, if , then
. This means that every field is an integral domain.

In addition, the following properties are true for any elements  and :

 if

The additive and the multiplicative group of a field
The axioms of a field  imply that it is an abelian group under addition. This group is called the additive group of the field, and is sometimes denoted by  when denoting it simply as  could be confusing.

A field may thus be defined as set  equipped with two operations denoted as an addition and a multiplication such that  is an abelian group under addition,  is an abelian group under multiplication (where 0 is the identity element of the addition), and multiplication is distributive over addition. Some elementary statements about fields can therefore be obtained by applying general facts of groups.

The requirement  follows, because 1 is the identity element of a group that does not contain 0. Thus, the trivial ring, consisting of a single element, is not a field.

Every finite subgroup of the multiplicative group of a field is cyclic (see ).

Characteristic

If there is no positive integer such that
,
then  is said to have characteristic 0. For example, the field of rational numbers  has characteristic 0 since no positive integer  is zero. Otherwise, if there is a positive integer  satisfying this equation, the smallest such positive integer can be shown to be a prime number.
For example, the field  has characteristic 2 since (in the notation of the above addition table) .

This implies that
,
Here,  ( factors) is the -th power, i.e., the -fold product of the element . Therefore, the Frobenius map

The existence of this homomorphism makes fields in characteristic  quite different from fields of characteristic 0.

Subfields and prime fields
Equivalently  is a subset of  that contains , and is closed under addition, multiplication, additive inverse and multiplicative inverse of a nonzero element.

All field homomorphisms are injective.

A field is called a prime field if it has no proper (i.e., strictly smaller) subfields. Any field  contains a prime field.

Finite fields

Finite fields (also called Galois fields) are fields with finitely many elements, whose number is also referred to as the order of the field. The above introductory example  is a field with four elements. Its subfield  is the smallest field, because by definition a field has at least two distinct elements .

The simplest finite fields, with prime order, are most directly accessible using modular arithmetic. For a fixed positive integer , arithmetic "modulo " means to work with the numbers

This construction yields a field precisely if  is a prime number. For example, taking the prime  results in the above-mentioned field .

This statement holds since  may be viewed as a vector space over its prime field. The dimension of this vector space is necessarily finite, say , which implies the asserted statement.

A field with  elements can be constructed as the splitting field of the polynomial
.
Elaborating further on basic field-theoretic notions, it can be shown that two finite fields with the same order are isomorphic.

History
Historically, three algebraic disciplines led to the concept of a field: the question of solving polynomial equations, algebraic number theory, and algebraic geometry. A first step towards the notion of a field was made in 1770 by Joseph-Louis Lagrange, who observed that permuting the zeros  of a cubic polynomial in the expression

(with  being a third root of unity) only yields two values. Together with a similar observation for equations of degree 4, Lagrange thus linked what eventually became the concept of fields and the concept of groups. Vandermonde, also in 1770, and to a fuller extent, Carl Friedrich Gauss, in his Disquisitiones Arithmeticae (1801), studied the equation

for a prime  and, again using modern language, the resulting cyclic Galois group. Gauss deduced that a regular -gon can be constructed if . Building on Lagrange's work, Paolo Ruffini claimed (1799) that quintic equations (polynomial equations of degree 5) cannot be solved algebraically; however, his arguments were flawed. These gaps were filled by Niels Henrik Abel in 1824. Évariste Galois, in 1832, devised necessary and sufficient criteria for a polynomial equation to be algebraically solvable, thus establishing in effect what is known as Galois theory today. Both Abel and Galois worked with what is today called an algebraic number field, but conceived neither an explicit notion of a field, nor of a group.

In 1871 Richard Dedekind introduced, for a set of real or complex numbers that is closed under the four arithmetic operations, the German word Körper, which means "body" or "corpus" (to suggest an organically closed entity).

In 1881 Leopold Kronecker defined what he called a domain of rationality, which is a field of rational fractions in modern terms. Kronecker's notion did not cover the field of all algebraic numbers (which is a field in Dedekind's sense), but on the other hand was more abstract than Dedekind's in that it made no specific assumption on the nature of the elements of a field. Kronecker interpreted a field such as  abstractly as the rational function field .

In particular, Heinrich Martin Weber's notion included the field Fp. Giuseppe Veronese (1891) studied the field of formal power series, which led  to introduce the field of p-adic numbers.  synthesized the knowledge of abstract field theory accumulated so far. He axiomatically studied the properties of fields and defined many important field-theoretic concepts. The majority of the theorems mentioned in the sections Galois theory, Constructing fields and Elementary notions can be found in Steinitz's work.  linked the notion of orderings in a field, and thus the area of analysis, to purely algebraic properties. Emil Artin redeveloped Galois theory from 1928 through 1942, eliminating the dependency on the primitive element theorem.

Constructing fields

Constructing fields from rings
A commutative ring is a set, equipped with an addition and multiplication operation, satisfying all the axioms of a field, except for the existence of multiplicative inverses . For example, the integers  form a commutative ring, but not a field: the reciprocal of an integer  is not itself an integer, unless .

In the hierarchy of algebraic structures fields can be characterized as the commutative rings  in which every nonzero element is a unit (which means every element is invertible).

Field of fractions

Given an integral domain , its field of fractions  is built with the fractions of two elements of  exactly as Q is constructed from the integers. The operation on the fractions work exactly as for rational numbers. For example,

It is straightforward to show that, if the ring is an integral domain, the set of the fractions form a field.

The field  of the rational fractions over a field (or an integral domain)  is the field of fractions of the polynomial ring . The field  of Laurent series

over a field  is the field of fractions of the ring  of formal power series (in which ).

Residue fields
In addition to the field of fractions, which embeds  injectively into a field, a field can be obtained from a commutative ring  by means of a surjective map onto a field .

This yields a field

This field  contains an element  (namely the residue class of ) which satisfies the equation
.

Constructing fields within a bigger field
Fields can be constructed inside a given bigger container field. Suppose given a field , and a field  containing  as a subfield.

Field extensions

,
and read " over ".

It satisfies the formula
.
Extensions whose degree is finite are referred to as finite extensions.

Algebraic extensions
A pivotal notion in the study of field extensions  are algebraic elements.
,
.
Any finite extension is necessarily algebraic, as can be deduced from the above multiplicativity formula.

The subfield  generated by an element , as above, is an algebraic extension of  if and only if  is an algebraic element.

Transcendence bases
A similar construction can be carried out with a set of indeterminates, instead of just one.

Any field extension  has a transcendence basis. Thus, field extensions can be split into ones of the form  (purely transcendental extensions) and algebraic extensions.

Closure operations
A field is algebraically closed if it does not have any strictly bigger algebraic extensions or, equivalently, if any polynomial equation
, with coefficients ,
has a solution . By the fundamental theorem of algebra,  is algebraically closed, i.e., any polynomial equation with complex coefficients has a complex solution. The rational and the real numbers are not algebraically closed since the equation

does not have any rational or real solution.

Such fields are also known as real closed fields.

Any field  has an algebraic closure, which is moreover unique up to (non-unique) isomorphism. It is commonly referred to as the algebraic closure and denoted . The field  is usually rather implicit since its construction requires the ultrafilter lemma, a set-theoretic axiom that is weaker than the axiom of choice. It is the union of the finite fields containing  (the ones of order ).

Fields with additional structure
Since fields are ubiquitous in mathematics and beyond, several refinements of the concept have been adapted to the needs of particular mathematical areas.

Ordered fields

For example, the real numbers form an ordered field, with the usual ordering . The Artin-Schreier theorem states that a field can be ordered if and only if it is a formally real field, which means that any quadratic equation

only has the solution .

An Archimedean field is an ordered field such that for each element there exists a finite expression

whose value is greater than that element, that is, there are no infinite elements.

An ordered field is Dedekind-complete if all upper bounds, lower bounds (see Dedekind cut) and limits, which should exist, do exist. Any complete field is necessarily Archimedean, since in any non-Archimedean field there is neither a greatest infinitesimal nor a least positive rational, whence the sequence , every element of which is greater than every infinitesimal, has no limit.

Since every proper subfield of the reals also contains such gaps,  is the unique complete ordered field, up to isomorphism. Several foundational results in calculus follow directly from this characterization of the reals.

The hyperreals  form an ordered field that is not Archimedean. It is an extension of the reals obtained by including infinite and infinitesimal numbers. These are larger, respectively smaller than any real number. The hyperreals form the foundational basis of non-standard analysis.

Topological fields
Another refinement of the notion of a field is a topological field, in which the set  is a topological space, such that all operations of the field (addition, multiplication, the maps  and ) are continuous maps with respect to the topology of the space.
The topology of all the fields discussed below is induced from a metric, i.e., a function

The following table lists some examples of this construction. The fourth column shows an example of a zero sequence, i.e., a sequence whose limit (for ) is zero.

The field  is used in number theory and -adic analysis. The completion of this algebraic closure, however, is algebraically closed.

Local fields
The following topological fields are called local fields:

These two types of local fields share some fundamental similarities. The following facts show that this superficial similarity goes much deeper:
 Any first-order statement that is true for almost all  is also true for almost all .
 Tamely ramified extensions of both fields are in bijection to one another.
Strikingly, the Galois groups of these two fields are isomorphic, which is the first glimpse of a remarkable parallel between these two fields:

Differential fields
Differential fields are fields equipped with a derivation, i.e., allow to take derivatives of elements in the field. For example, the field R(X), together with the standard derivative of polynomials forms a differential field. These fields are central to differential Galois theory, a variant of Galois theory dealing with linear differential equations.

Galois theory

Galois theory studies algebraic extensions of a field by studying the symmetry in the arithmetic operations of addition and multiplication. An important notion in this area is that of finite Galois extensions , which are, by definition, those that are separable and normal. The primitive element theorem shows that finite separable extensions are necessarily simple, i.e., of the form
,
where  is an irreducible polynomial (as above). The latter condition is always satisfied if  has characteristic 0.

By means of this correspondence, group-theoretic properties translate into facts about fields. For example, if the Galois group of a Galois extension as above is not solvable (cannot be built from abelian groups), then the zeros of  cannot be expressed in terms of addition, multiplication, and radicals, i.e., expressions involving . Consequently, as can be shown, the zeros of the following polynomials are not expressible by sums, products, and radicals. For the latter polynomial, this fact is known as the Abel–Ruffini theorem:
 (and ),

The tensor product of fields is not usually a field. For example, a finite extension  of degree  is a Galois extension if and only if there is an isomorphism of -algebras
.
This fact is the beginning of Grothendieck's Galois theory, a far-reaching extension of Galois theory applicable to algebro-geometric objects.

Invariants of fields

The latter is defined as the maximal number of elements in  that are algebraically independent over the prime field. This implies that any two uncountable algebraically closed fields of the same cardinality and the same characteristic are isomorphic.

Model theory of fields
The mathematical statements in question are required to be first-order sentences (involving 0, 1, the addition and multiplication).
 = "any polynomial of degree  in  has a zero in "
The set of such formulas for all  expresses that   is algebraically closed.
The Lefschetz principle states that  is elementarily equivalent to any algebraically closed field  of characteristic zero. Moreover, any fixed statement  holds in  if and only if it holds in any algebraically closed field of sufficiently high characteristic.

It is denoted by
,
since it behaves in several ways as a limit of the fields : Łoś's theorem states that any first order statement that holds for all but finitely many , also holds for the ultraproduct. Applied to the above sentence , this shows that there is an isomorphism

The Ax–Kochen theorem mentioned above also follows from this and an isomorphism of the ultraproducts (in both cases over all primes )
.
In addition, model theory also studies the logical properties of various other types of fields, such as real closed fields or exponential fields (which are equipped with an exponential function ).

The absolute Galois group
.
A description in terms of generators and relations is also known for the Galois groups of -adic number fields (finite extensions of ).

Representations of Galois groups and of related groups such as the Weil group are fundamental in many branches of arithmetic, such as the Langlands program. The cohomological study of such representations is done using Galois cohomology. For example, the Brauer group, which is classically defined as the group of central simple -algebras, can be reinterpreted as a Galois cohomology group, namely
.

K-theory
Milnor K-theory is defined as

The norm residue isomorphism theorem, proved around 2000 by Vladimir Voevodsky, relates this to Galois cohomology by means of an isomorphism

Algebraic K-theory is related to the group of invertible matrices with coefficients the given field. For example, the process of taking the determinant of an invertible matrix leads to an isomorphism K1(F) = F×. Matsumoto's theorem shows that K2(F) agrees with K2M(F). In higher degrees, K-theory diverges from Milnor K-theory and remains hard to compute in general.

Applications

Linear algebra and commutative algebra
If , then the equation

has a unique solution  in a field , namely  This immediate consequence of the definition of a field is fundamental in linear algebra. For example, it is an essential ingredient of Gaussian elimination and of the proof that any vector space has a basis.

The theory of modules (the analogue of vector spaces over rings instead of fields) is much more complicated, because the above equation may have several or no solutions. In particular systems of linear equations over a ring are much more difficult to solve than in the case of fields, even in the specially simple case of the ring  of the integers.

Finite fields: cryptography and coding theory

A widely applied cryptographic routine uses the fact that discrete exponentiation, i.e., computing
 ( factors, for an integer )
in a (large) finite field  can be performed much more efficiently than the discrete logarithm, which is the inverse operation, i.e., determining the solution  to an equation
.
In elliptic curve cryptography, the multiplication in a finite field is replaced by the operation of adding points on an elliptic curve, i.e., the solutions of an equation of the form
.

Finite fields are also used in coding theory and combinatorics.

Geometry: field of functions

Functions on a suitable topological space  into a field  can be added and multiplied pointwise, e.g., the product of two functions is defined by the product of their values within the domain:
.
This makes these functions a -commutative algebra.

For having a field of functions, one must consider algebras of functions that are integral domains. In this case the ratios of two functions, i.e., expressions of the form

form a field, called field of functions.

This occurs in two main cases. When  is a complex manifold . In this case, one considers the algebra of holomorphic functions, i.e., complex differentiable functions.

The function field of an algebraic variety  (a geometric object defined as the common zeros of polynomial equations) consists of ratios of regular functions, i.e., ratios of polynomial functions on the variety. In other words, the function field is insensitive to replacing  by a (slightly) smaller subvariety.

The function field is invariant under isomorphism and birational equivalence of varieties. It is therefore an important tool for the study of abstract algebraic varieties and for the classification of algebraic varieties. For curves (i.e., the dimension is one), the function field  is very close to : if  is smooth and proper (the analogue of being compact),  can be reconstructed, up to isomorphism, from its field of functions. The study of function fields and their geometric meaning in higher dimensions is referred to as birational geometry. The minimal model program attempts to identify the simplest (in a certain precise sense) algebraic varieties with a prescribed function field.

Number theory: global fields

Global fields are in the limelight in algebraic number theory and arithmetic geometry.
As for local fields, these two types of fields share several similar features, even though they are of characteristic 0 and positive characteristic, respectively. This function field analogy can help to shape mathematical expectations, often first by understanding questions about function fields, and later treating the number field case. The latter is often more difficult. For example, the Riemann hypothesis concerning the zeros of the Riemann zeta function (open as of 2017) can be regarded as being parallel to the Weil conjectures (proven in 1974 by Pierre Deligne).

Cyclotomic fields are among the most intensely studied number fields. For  being a regular prime, Kummer used cyclotomic fields to prove Fermat's Last Theorem, which asserts the non-existence of rational nonzero solutions to the equation
.

Local fields are completions of global fields. Studying arithmetic questions in global fields may sometimes be done by looking at the corresponding questions locally. This technique is called the local-global principle.

Unlike for local fields, the Galois groups of global fields are not known. Inverse Galois theory studies the (unsolved) problem whether any finite group is the Galois group  for some number field . Class field theory describes the abelian extensions, i.e., ones with abelian Galois group, or equivalently the abelianized Galois groups of global fields. A classical statement, the Kronecker–Weber theorem, describes the maximal abelian  extension of : it is the field

obtained by adjoining all primitive -th roots of unity. For imaginary quadratic fields, the theory of complex multiplication describes  using elliptic curves. For general number fields, no such explicit description is known.

Related notions

In addition to the additional structure that fields may enjoy, fields admit various other related notions. Since in any field 0 ≠ 1, any field has at least two elements. Nonetheless, there is a concept of field with one element, which is suggested to be a limit of the finite fields , as  tends to 1. In addition to division rings, there are various other weaker algebraic structures related to fields such as quasifields, near-fields and semifields.

There are also proper classes with field structure, which are sometimes called Fields, with a capital F. The surreal numbers form a Field containing the reals, and would be a field except for the fact that they are a proper class, not a set. The nimbers, a concept from game theory, form such a Field as well.

Division rings

Dropping one or several axioms in the definition of a field leads to other algebraic structures. As was mentioned above, commutative rings satisfy all field axioms except for the existence of multiplicative inverses. Dropping instead commutativity of multiplication leads to the concept of a division ring or skew field; sometimes associativity is weakened as well.  The only division rings that are finite-dimensional -vector spaces are  itself,  (which is a field), and the quaternions  (in which multiplication is non-commutative). This result is known as the Frobenius theorem. The octonions , for which multiplication is neither commutative nor associative, is a normed alternative division algebra, but is not a division ring. This fact was proved using methods of algebraic topology in 1958 by Michel Kervaire, Raoul Bott, and John Milnor. The non-existence of an odd-dimensional division algebra is more classical. It can be deduced from the hairy ball theorem illustrated at the right.

Notes

References

 
 
 , especially Chapter 13
 
 
 
 
 
 . See especially Book 3 and Book 6.

External links

 
Algebraic structures
Abstract algebra